Veronica pimeleoides, synonym Hebe pimeleoides, is a flowering plant of the family Plantaginaceae. It is endemic to the dry mountains of Marlborough and Canterbury, in South Island of New Zealand. It is a low-growing, evergreen shrub, reaching 60 cm in height, with grey-green, spear-shaped leaves that are 7–10 mm long. Flowers are pale lilac.

The compact cultivar 'Quicksilver', with blue/grey leaves and white flowers, is a recipient of the Royal Horticultural Society's Award of Garden Merit.

References

 
 Hebe Society entry
 
 Trans. & Proc. New Zealand Inst. 57:38. 1926.
 Allan, H. H. B. et al. 1961–. Flora of New Zealand.
 Encke, F. et al. 1984. Zander: Handwörterbuch der Pflanzennamen, 13. Auflage.
 Kellow, A. V. et al. 2003. "Variation in morphology and flavonoid chemistry in Hebe pimeleoides (Scrophulariaceae), including a revised subspecific classification", New Zealand J. Bot. 41:233–253.
 Liberty Hyde Bailey Hortorium. 1976. Hortus third.

pimeleoides
Flora of New Zealand
Taxa named by Joseph Dalton Hooker